is a 1991 Japanese film directed by Junji Sakamoto.

Cast
 Hidekazu Akai
 Masaya Kato
 Reona Hirota
 Yūko Nitō
 Nobuo Kaneko
 Tomisaburo Wakayama

Reception
Ōte was chosen as the 3rd Best Film at the 13th Yokohama Film Festival. Reona Hirota also won the Award for Best Supporting Actress.

References

External links
 

Films directed by Junji Sakamoto
Works about shogi
Films about board games
1990s Japanese films